Marco Zanetti (born 10 April 1962) is an Italian professional three-cushion billiards player and a two-time world champion from Bolzano, Italy.

Privat 
Zanetti started playing billiards at 7. He needed a chair to play. His father, Erwin Zanetti, was the president of the Carambole Circle of Bolzano.

He is regarded as a brilliant billiards player, but also a controversial person who does not hold back with criticism of the world or continental federation and organizers. This brought him in the past, often the wrath of the organizers, as well as its behavior in different tournaments. Because of his criticism of the UMB at the World Cup 2009 tournament in Korea Zanetti was occupied by a lifetime 50-point penalty. Two years later, at the end of the three-band World Cup, also in Suwon, South Korea, the UMB took this penalty back and the end of the year he received his 50 points back for the world ranking.

Zanetti lives with his wife Martina and son Samuel (born 2008) in his birth town in South Tyrol. As a south tyrolian he also speaks fluently German. His nickname in the billiards scene is The Italian gentleman.

Early years 
In his early career he won the balkline European Championship twice, 1983 in 47/2-Balkline and 1984 in 47/1-Balkline. Later he switched to three-cushion where he won the Biathlon (three-cushin and 5-pins) World Championship in 1988 and 1996.

First success in 3-cushion 
He reached the finals of the UMB World Three-cushion Championship in 2001, but was bested by Raymond Ceulemans. He made it into the finals again a year later and won the title, defeating Dion Nelin of Denmark. He has been the only Italian to win a world championship in the sport as of 2007. He was ranked 7th in the world as of 2007 by the Confédération Européenne de Billard.

Zanetti also has 25 Italian national titles. He is 7-time winner, from 2004/05 to 2011/12, of the Coupe d’Europe, a tournament series for clubs which is held since the season of 1958/59, it is comparable to the Champions League in Football. He plays for the club of BC AGIPI Courbevoie in France. His teammates in the Season 2011/12 are Frédéric Caudron (Belgium), Jérémy Bury (France) and Jean-Christophe Roux (France).

On 19 October 2008, he again won the world three-cushion championship in the German city of St. Wendel. He defeated Jérémy Bury of France in the semi-finals and then went on to beat Torbjorn Blomdahl of Sweden in the finals, averaging 1.871 in the five-set match. Through this victory he reached his best ranking in his career, so far, with the 5. place.

In 2010 he won the best paid tournament at this time, the Crystal Kelly Cup in Nice, France, again Torbjörn Blomdahl was his losing opponent. One year later he was the runner-up to Filippos Kasidokostas from Greece. The Crystal Kelly Cup was an invitation tournament which has been sponsored by the Dutch software developer Joop van Oosterom. It has been named after his daughter Crystal Kelly.

Season 2012/13 
At the 2012 3-cushion World Championship in Porto, Portugal he came, together with Caudron in third place. One week later he placed second at the third 3-cushion World Cup of 2012 in the South Korean town of Suwon.

On 17 March 2013 he won the final of the first Lausanne Billiard Masters in Lausanne, Switzerland against Frédéric Caudron from Belgium. Zanetti was winning on the last ball with a fluke to 40-33. In the semi-final, opponent was Torbjörn Blomdahl, he was playing the highest run of the tournament with 15 balls which gave him an extra bonus of 400 €. Finally he has been paid 6,700 € for his victory. Just one week later he was winning the AGIPI Billiard Masters in Schiltigheim, again Caudron was his opponent. On 14 April he won the CEB European Three-cushion Championship. In the final he beats German ex-1996-World-Champion Christian Rudolph with 40-10. In the semi-final, he won third time in row against Caudron, although the Belgian was equalizing world record in High-Run of 28 points. Zanetti also made the new European record in General-Average of 2,500.

Personal records 
His highest run in a match is 21 and his best game average is 5.555 (50 points in 9 innings).

Honours 
In 2003 he won the title as "Player of the Year" in Antwerp.

References

External links

 

1962 births
Living people
Place of birth missing (living people)
Italian carom billiards players
World champions in three-cushion billiards
World Games gold medalists
World Games bronze medalists
World Games silver medalists
Competitors at the 2009 World Games
Competitors at the 2013 World Games
Competitors at the 2017 World Games